Dora Postigo Salvatore (Madrid, Spain; April 9, 2004) is a Spanish actress, model and singer.

Biography 
She was born on April 9 2004 in Madrid (Spain) to the model Bimba Bosé and the musician and filmmaker Diego Postigo. She is the great-granddaughter, on her mother's side, of the actress Lucía Bosè and the bullfighter Luis Miguel Dominguín, as well as the great-niece of Miguel Bosé and Paola Dominguín. Therefore, she is the granddaughter of artists Alessandro Salvatore and Luca Domingun. She has a sister, June, born in 2011.

Professional career 
She started playing the piano at the age of five, and by the age of nine she was creating her own versions of songs by Ella Fitzgerald and Kendrick Lamar. She started uploading videos to Youtube two years later. She became vocalist for La Creativa Junior Big Band a year later.

She performed her first concert, in the company of her father and sister, in 2017. She began composing her own songs at the age of 13, capturing the attention of producer Pional, who helped her produce her first album. In 2019, she released her first single to the market titled Saving Star which was streamed almost two million times on Spotify. Months later, she released the single Call Me Back, which has been streamed more than seven million times on the same platform. In 2020, she released the single Ojos de serpiente on the television program Operación Triunfo, composed by herself and whose video clip was directed by Paco León. In March 2021, she released the songs Quiéreme and La Bestia, months later, together with Delaporte.

In November 2018, she debuted as a model for David Delfín's label. 

Three years later, her acting debut was also announced, with a starring role as Dora in Rainbow, directed by Paco León.

Discography 

 «Saving Star» (2019)
 «Call Me Back» (2019)
 «Home» (2019)
 «Ojos de serpiente» (2020)
 «Stay» (2020)
 «Hoy» (2020)
 «Oxena» (2020)
 «Quiéreme» (2021)
 «La Bestia» ft. Delaporte (2021)

Filmography

Cinema

Television

References 

2004 births
21st-century Spanish women singers
21st-century Spanish singers
Spanish film actresses
Living people